Agrippa may refer to:

People

Antiquity
 Agrippa (mythology), semi-mythological king of Alba Longa
 Agrippa (astronomer), Greek astronomer from the late 1st century
 Agrippa the Skeptic, Skeptic philosopher at the end of the 1st century
 Agrippa Menenius Lanatus, Roman consul in 503 BC
 Marcus Vipsanius Agrippa (63–12 BC), Roman statesman and general, friend and lieutenant of Augustus Caesar
 Agrippa Postumus (12 BC–AD 14)
 Gaius Fonteius Agrippa, father and son with the same name; the former an accuser of Libo, the latter suffect consul in AD 58
 Decimus Haterius Agrippa, consul in AD 22
 Marcus Asinius Agrippa, consul in AD 25
 Vibulenus Agrippa, committed suicide in the Roman senate in AD 36
 Herod Agrippa, (10 BC–AD 44) grandson of Herod the Great, king of Judea, friend of Claudius
 Herod Agrippa II, (AD 27–100), his son
 Agrippa Castor, Christian Roman writer of the 2nd century
 Julius Agrippa, Centurion of the 2nd century
 Marcius Agrippa, slave of the 3rd century who was eventually elevated to senatorial rank by Macrinus

Modern era
 Heinrich Cornelius Agrippa (1486–1535), occultist, philosopher, and theologian
 Camillo Agrippa, sixteenth-century architect who applied geometric theory to the art of fencing
 Agrippa d'Aubigné (1552–1630), French poet, soldier, propagandist and chronicler

Fictional characters 
 Mumboz Agrippa, a character from the Zork series of computer games
 Salome Agrippa, a character from True Blood
 Mighty Agrippa, Roman God of the Aqueduct, a character from The Tick
 Agrippa, a character from the video game Amnesia: The Dark Descent, likely based on Heinrich Cornelius Agrippa
 Agrippa, a character from the 1845 children's book Struwwelpeter

Other uses 
 Agrippa (praenomen), a Latin personal name
 Agrippa (crater), an impact crater on the moon
 Agrippa (A Book of the Dead), a 1992 work of art by William Gibson and others
 A fictional space destroyer in the Earth Alliance Civil War in the Babylon 5 television series
 Pedestal of Agrippa in Athens

See also 
 Agrippina (disambiguation)
 Agrippinus (disambiguation)
 King Agrippa (disambiguation)